UCG may refer to:

Universities
 Universidade Católica de Goiás, a Catholic university in Brazil
 University College, Galway, a National University of Ireland
 University of Montenegro

Other uses
 Serine, a proteinogenic amino acid, specified by redundant codons in the genetic code that include UCG
 UCG or United Communications Group, a privately held company, owner of GasBuddy
 Underground coal gasification, a process carried on in non-mined coal seams
 United Church of God, a Christian denomination

See also
 UGC (disambiguation)